Le Port is the name or part of the name of several communes in France:
 Le Port, Ariège, in the Ariège département 
 Le Port, Réunion, in the island of Réunion
 Le Port-Marly, in the Yvelines département

It may also refer to:
Le Port (painting), also known as The Harbor or Marine, by Jean Metzinger

See also 
 Port (disambiguation)